Darren Goldspink (born 12 September 1964) is a veteran Australian rules football umpire in the Australian Football League.

Goldspink was awarded the prestigious All Australian Umpire award three times over his career in 1993, 1995 and 2005, earning himself an AFL Grand Final appointment on each occasion. He also umpired in the 1998, 2000 and 2006 AFL Grand Finals.

Two rounds later (in Round 17), Goldspink umpired his 350th VFL/AFL match.

Prior to the 2007 AFL season, Goldspink was dropped by the AFL umpiring panel due to lack of fitness. He returned, after attaining the levels required, and umpired again in Round 10, 2007.

References

Australian Football League umpires
1964 births
Living people